is a private junior women's college in Kitakyushu, Fukuoka, Japan, established in 1950. In 2004 it became partially coeducational.

External links
 Official website 

Educational institutions established in 1950
Private universities and colleges in Japan
Universities and colleges in Fukuoka Prefecture
Japanese junior colleges
1950 establishments in Japan